Five referendums were held in Switzerland in 1970. The first was held on 1 February on a federal resolution on the domestic sugar market, and was approved by voters. The second was held on 7 June on a popular initiative "against foreign infiltration", and was rejected by voters. The third and fourth were held on 27 September on an amendment to the Swiss Federal Constitution regarding promoting gymnastics and sports, which was approved, and a popular initiative on the "right to habitation and expansion of family protection", which was rejected. The fifth was held on 15 November on an amendment to the federal financial order, which was rejected due to not enough cantons voting in favour.

Results

February: Domestic sugar market

June: Popular initiative against foreign infiltration

September: Constitutional amendment on promotion of sports

September: Popular initiative on housing

November: Financial order

References

1970 referendums
1970 in Switzerland
Referendums in Switzerland